Stokes Township, Ohio could refer to:

Stokes Township, Logan County, Ohio
Stokes Township, Madison County, Ohio

Ohio township disambiguation pages